Red Moors (RM) is a regionalist (separatist), social-democratic political party in Sardinia.

The party was founded in 2009 as a left-wing split from the Sardinian Action Party (Psd'Az), after the Psd'Az had signed an electoral pact with The People of Freedom, the main centre-right party in Italy. In the 2009 regional election the RM won 2.5% of the vote, despite not being on the ballot in three provincial constituencies out of eight, and one regional councillor, Claudia Zuncheddu. The list did better in the province of Sassari (4.2%) and the province of Nuoro (3.3%).

In the 2010 provincial elections the Red Moors improved their share of vote and were particularly strong in Medio Campidano (7.1%), the province of Nuoro (4.2%) and the province of Cagliari (3.1%).

In January 2011 Zuncheddu left the party in order to join Independence Republic of Sardinia. This caused a major upheaval within the party, which was left without representation in the Regional Council.

However the party pushed back and, in the 2014 regional election, it won 2.6% of the vote and two regional councillors.

Leadership
Secretary: Gesuino Muledda (2009–2012), Salvatore Melis (2012–2014), Marco Pau (2014–present)
President: Paola Zunchedda (2009–2011), Gesuino Muledda (2012–2018)

References

External links
Official website 

Political parties in Sardinia
Sardinian nationalist parties
Political parties established in 2009
2009 establishments in Italy
Social democratic parties in Italy